Devil Woman may refer to:
 "Devil Woman" (Marty Robbins song) (1962)
 "Devil Woman", a 1970 song by Clarence Carter, written by George Jackson
 "Devil Woman", a 1973 song by Ringo Starr from Ringo
 "Devil Woman" (Cliff Richard song) (1976)
 "Devil Woman", a 1992 song by The Red Devils (blues band) from King King
 "Devil Woman", a 2002 song by Poison from Hollyweird
 "Devil Woman", a 2005 song by Cradle of Filth from Nymphetamine

See also
The Devil Is a Woman (disambiguation)
She devil (disambiguation)
A Devil of a Woman, 1951 Austrian drama film
Devil Lady, aka Devilman Lady, a horror manga and anime